May is an unincorporated community in Brown County, Texas, United States. According to the Handbook of Texas, the community had an estimated population of 285 in 2000. May was designated a Recorded Texas Historic Landmark in 1981, with marker number 5377. In 2001, historical marker 12532 was added for May United Methodist Church, commemorating the church's presence in the community for over 100 years. The May Cemetery was designated a Historic Texas Cemetery in 2016.

Geography

History
The area was originally part of a Mexican land grant given to empresario John Cameron in 1827. The community itself was developed in the 1870s and was named for pioneer settler W.D. May. May's brother, Nathan, opened a store at the site in 1879. A post office was established two years later. In 1907, May had a blacksmith shop, general store, newspaper, and bank.

That same year, the community became a stop on the Brownwood North and South Railway. The line was abandoned in 1927. The population had grown to roughly 500 by 1940 and had several churches and 14 businesses. During the following years, May began to slowly decline. The community was home to around 285 residents by 1980. That figure remained steady through 2000. Although May is unincorporated, it has a post office, with the ZIP code of 76857.

May had slow growth in population since the landscape was sandy. The community also had Baptist and Methodist churches.

Education
The May Independent School District provides public education in the community of May. Before then, May had a school called Old Swayback school.

Climate
The climate in this area is characterized by hot, humid summers and generally mild to cool winters. According to the Köppen climate classification system, May has a humid subtropical climate, Cfa on climate maps.

Notable person
 J.W. Harris, bull rider, moved to May at age 15 and graduated from May High School.

References

Unincorporated communities in Texas
Unincorporated communities in Brown County, Texas
Recorded Texas Historic Landmarks